A courser is a swift and strong horse, frequently used during the Middle Ages as a warhorse. It was ridden by knights and men-at-arms.

Etymology
Coursers are commonly believed to be named for their running gait, (from Old French cours, 'to run'). However, the word possibly derived from the Italian corsiero, meaning 'battle horse'.

Coursers in warfare
The courser was more common than the destrier, and preferred for battle as they were light, fast and strong. They were valuable horses, but less expensive than the highly prized destrier. Another horse commonly ridden during war was the rouncey, an all-purpose horse.

Other uses
Coursers were also used occasionally for hunting.

See also
Horses in the Middle Ages

Notes and references

Warfare of the Middle Ages
Warhorses
Types of horse